The Danish Experience (or A Danish Experience/Experiment) (Al-Tagroba Al-Danemarkeya or El tagrubah el danemarkiyyah) (Arabic: التجربة الدنماركية) is a popular 2003 Egyptian comedy film starring Adel Emam and Nicole Saba.

Plot

Adel Imam stars as Qadri, a widower and newly appointed government minister, whose four grown sons live with him.  In her first acting gig, Lebanese singer Nicole Saba plays the buxom-blonde role of Danish student Aneta Henry Gothenburg, visiting Egypt for the first time to pursue her studies.  She stays with Qadri and his family.  Highlighting cultural differences in comedic fashion (among other things, free-spirited Aneta tries to teach Qadri's sons about sex, and intrudes on a government meeting dressed as a bellydancer), Qadri eventually falls for Aneta, but so do his sons.  After a blowup, he finally chooses to stay with his sons.

Reception

In January 2004, Asharq Al-Awsat reported that the film was the second-highest grossing Egyptian film of 2003, with revenue exceeding , not counting foreign distribution.  The film was considered to be an "enormous success." It was also the highest grossing film in Lebanon for the year.

The scanty clothing and sexually-open nature of Saba's character in an Arabic language film caused some criticism.  Saba noted that the film shows the differences in two cultures, and "the entire film was daring, but at the same time respectful."

Cast
Adel Emam - Qadri El-Mieniawy
Nicole Saba - Aneta
Magdy Kamel - Mahmoud Qadri
Khaled Sarhan - Abdelrhman Qadri
Tamer Hagrus - Ibrahim Qadri
Ahmed El tohamy - Hussain Qadri
Ahmed Rateb - Shokry El-Saied
Sami Sarhan - Server of Minister's Village
Mohamed El Dafrawy - Prime minister
Gharib Mahmoud - Qadri's friend
Talaat Zakaria -  Police officer
Saied Tarabik - Qadri's friend
Khaled Shebl - Baha'
Heba Abdelhakim - Baha's bride
Saied Sadek - Father of Baha's bride
Ragaa ElGedawi - One scene
Ahmed Helmy - Himself
Mona Zaki - Herself

References

External links
 

Egyptian comedy films
Films set in Egypt
2003 films
2000s Arabic-language films